This is a list of foreign players in the Philippines Football League. The following players are considered foreign if they do not hold a Philippine passport. If a player is naturalized through various means, then he is no longer considered a foreign player.

Up to now, 33 different nations have been represented in the Philippines Football League.

Current foreign players

PFL clubs can register a maximum of six foreign players with at least one player of AFC affiliated nationality, but may only register four per matchday.

Foreign players

Asia (AFC)

Africa (CAF)

Europe (UEFA)

North and Central America, Caribbean (CONCACAF)

Oceania (OFC)

South America (CONMEBOL)

References

External links
 Philippines Football League
 Philippines Football Federation

Philippines Football League
Filipino footballers